Menelaida is a former municipality in the Karditsa regional unit, Thessaly, Greece. Since the 2011 local government reform it is part of the municipality Sofades, of which it is a municipal unit. The municipal unit has an area of 169.840 km2. As of 2011 the population was 1,850. The seat of the municipality was in Kedros.

References

Populated places in Karditsa (regional unit)

el:Δήμος Σοφάδων#Μενελαΐδας